Jon Richardson: Ultimate Worrier is a British panel show broadcast on Dave. The first series premiered on 16 May 2018. In the show Jon Richardson and the panel talk about and rank worries in order of severity in the Worry Index. Worries are categorised as either a low, moderate or severe worry. The first series also features sketches in which Rose Matafeo and Richard Gadd research topics Richardson is worried about. A second series of ten episodes began on 3 July 2019.

Production
The show was announced by Dave on 23 January 2018. A clip of the show was released by Digital Spy on 27 April. A video listing Richardson's "top 8 worries" was released on 2 May. The first series of eight hour-long episodes aired from 16 May to 4 July.

Jon Richardson has obsessive–compulsive personality disorder, which he previously discussed in his first Edinburgh Festival Fringe show in 2007. Richardson said that making the show allowed him to "compartmentalise" and was "so cathartic", describing comedy as "a great way to have those conversations but trying to make people feel better". He tells Radio Times that he wants viewers to realise "the world is fundamentally a funny place".

In December 2018, it was announced that the show had been renewed for a second series of ten episodes, to be filmed and broadcast in 2019. The second series began on 3 July 2019 and consisted of 10 episodes. A censored version of the first episode was mistakenly broadcast when it first premiered, despite its timeslot of 10 p.m., one hour after the watershed ended.

Discussing the second series, Richardson said that it was more topical than the first series; he said the show's format allowed quick changes from "lighter" topics to "big news stories", such as climate change, which he described as "the biggest [worry] of all". His wife Lucy Beaumont features as a guest in multiple episodes. Though Richardson was initially reluctant to work with Beaumont, he said "we gradually did a few bits together and it just seemed to come really easily".

Episodes
<onlyinclude>

Series 1 (2018)

Series 2 (2019)

Reception 
Steve Bennett of Chortle compares the show to Room 101, but notes that Richardson "puts a more distinctive spin on the format", commenting on the rarity of a panel show being "so closely moulded to the foibles of its host". Bennett criticises that the show "should really be a 30-minute format", but summarises it as an "entertaining passer of time". In a three-star review for The Times, Carol Midgley also criticises that "[s]ome parts went on too long", though also calling other parts "nerdishly amusing". Oprah Flash of Cable recommends the show to people who have "enjoyed the dry wit [Richardson] brings to 8 Out of 10 Cats".

Notes

References

External links 
 
 

2018 British television series debuts
2019 British television series endings
2010s British comedy television series
British panel games
2010s British game shows
Dave (TV channel) original programming
English-language television shows
Television series by Fremantle (company)
Television shows shot at Elstree Film Studios